The Other is the 40th book in the Animorphs series, ghostwritten by Gina Gascone (as K. A. Applegate). It is narrated by Marco.

Plot summary

The Animorphs meet survivors of Elfangor's Dome Ship, the GalaxyTree. One Andalite called Gafinilan-Estrif-Valad suffers from a genetic disease called Soola's Disease while Mertil-Iscar-Elmand, is crippled, or a "vecol", as Ax puts it, missing half of his tail.

Gafinilan attacks Marco when he gets too close to the human home he owns, while Ax comes to his defense.  Both enter his home and Gafinilan asks to meet Ax's prince, not realizing his "prince" is human, as Visser Three had captured Mertil and had offered his release only if Gafinilan brought him a healthy adult Andalite (as Mertil was a vecol, and Visser Three discovered through Mertil that Gafinilan had a fatal disease, rendering them both as useless, in the Visser's perspective). The Animorphs assume that since Soola's Disease is genetic, and the only 'cure' is for Gafinilan to acquire and morph another Andalite, this is the reason why Gafinilan wanted to meet Ax's "prince", not wanting to acquire Ax himself because he would prefer to morph the adult Andalite he believes Jake is, as Ax's body would take too long to reach physical maturity.

Jake agrees to meet with him, with the intention of laying a trap for Gafinilan, and they overpower him by force of numbers. When they tell Gafinilan what they assumed his plan was, he is shocked at the mere thought, as Andalites consider using morphing to escape an illness as an act of cowardice. He confesses his real intentions, justifying his attempt at betraying one of his own kind by saying he cares deeply about his partner Mertil, and he did what he was told to do by the Visser in order to ensure Mertil's safety. Although still skeptical of Gafinilan's motives, they join forces with him and help rescue Mertil from Visser Three.

Ax, who is so far in the series seen as an honourable character, shows his open disapproval of Mertil and the thought that he should be treated with as much respect as other Andalites, on the grounds that he is disabled, which may have been a trait he picked up from his Andalite upbringing, as Andalites as a whole are shown in this book to not take their handicapped kind seriously. However, when Marco accuses his kind of being unfeeling, Ax points out that humans are similarly flawed, as people with handicaps are often pushed away from the limelight and kept hidden away in hospitals and institutions, instead of being allowed to live the kind of life they would have had, were they not disabled.

The softer side of Marco's personality is also shown in this book, as he shows concern about how Mertil, a morph-incapable Andalite, would survive in a human world once his partner Gafinilan succumbs to his illness and passes away. He visits Mertil at the end of the book and offers his support and company, should Mertil ever feel he needed it. Although he fears that Mertil might regard his offer as impertinent, as Andalites are a proud race that do not like to be seen as vulnerable, Mertil thanks him, and appears to consider his offer.

Morphs

References

Animorphs books
2000 science fiction novels
2000 American novels
Disability in fiction